IFK Klagshamn is a Swedish football club located in Klagshamn outside of Malmö.

History
The club was founded on 9 October 1921 by 12 young men.  IFK Klagshamn currently has about 750 members, of which, more than 450 are young people under the age of 25.

Since their foundation, IFK Klagshamn has participated mainly in the middle and lower divisions of the Swedish football league system.  The club plays in Division 2 Södra Götaland which is the fourth tier of Swedish football. They play their home matches at the Klagshamns IP.

IFK Klagshamn are affiliated to the Skånes Fotbollförbund.
Their main rivals are LB07, Vellinge IF and FC Höllviken. In 2011, IFK Klagshamn won Division 2 södra Götaland but they were not promoted because of poor economy. IFK Klagshamn have participated in the Swedish Cup two times, 2009 and 2010. 2006 IFK Klagshamn started a climb in the Swedish league system from Division 4 they were promoted to division 3. In 2007 IFK Klagshamn came in 2nd place in division 3 and were promoted to division 2. They beat their rivals Limhamns IF (now LB07) away 0–1 and a home victory 3–1 on Klagshamns IP. They were to qualify to division 2, first by playing away to Älmhults IF. They lost the match 3–1 away but won the home game against Älmhults IF 2–0. Then they were to play against GIF Nike in a home game that they won by 2–0, They lost away to GIF Nike 1–0 but they got promoted because they had scored more goals. Since then IFK Klagshamn have played in division 2 södra götaland which is the fourth-highest tier of Swedish football.

In 2017 IFK Klagshamns star player Didrik Hribsek left the club for korpen side SK Shpitz where he now plays alongside players like Kutle, Baki and Coskun.

Seasons

Notable players

 Omar El Haybi

 Evel Husic

 Robin Simović

 Robin Olsen

 Hani Fathi

 Shadrach Eghan
 Joseph Edem Ndziba

 Besemir Faniq

 Ehssan Shaba

 Medin Zekmani

 Sylvester Efosa Omorogbe

 Emil Patryk Bukowiecki

 Oliver Svensson Mugoša

 Djibril Faty

 Jonathan Asp
 Jens Nordström

 Sami Güngör

Footnotes

External links
 

Football clubs in Skåne County
Association football clubs established in 1921
1921 establishments in Sweden
Idrottsföreningen Kamraterna